Mohd Hairi bin Mad Shah is a Malaysian politician who has served as Member of the Johor State Executive Council (EXCO) in the Barisan Nasional (BN) state administration under Menteri Besar Onn Hafiz Ghazi and Member of the Johor State Legislative Assembly (MLA) for Larkin since March 2022. He is a member of the United Malays National Organisation (UMNO), a component party of the BN coalition. He has also served as the Deputy Youth Chief of UMNO since March 2023.

Election results

References 

Living people
1984 births
People from Johor Bahru
Malaysian people of Malay descent
Malaysian Muslims
United Malays National Organisation politicians
21st-century Malaysian politicians
Members of the Johor State Legislative Assembly